"What You Do" is a song by Polish singer Margaret. It was released as the lead single from her third studio album, Monkey Business (2017), on 12 May 2017. The song was written by Margaret, Arash, Robert Uhlmann, Anderz Wrethov and Thomas Karlsson, and produced by Uhlmann, Alex P and Victory.

The single reached number 14 on the Polish Airplay Chart. It also charted in Russia and received radio airplay in Sweden (the single peaked at number one on the Rix FM chart).

Music video
A music video for the song was released on 12 May 2017. It was filmed in Cyprus, and directed by Konrad Aksinowicz. The video depicts Margaret as the star of a video game.

Track listing

Accolades

Charts

Weekly charts

Year-end charts

Release history

References

2017 singles
2017 songs
Margaret (singer) songs
Magic Records singles
Song recordings produced by Alex P
Songs written by Alex P
Songs written by Margaret (singer)
Songs written by Robert Uhlmann (composer)
Songs written by Wrethov